Sebastian Ianc (born 6 December 1986) is a Romanian professional footballer who plays as a midfielder for Liga V side Slovan Valea Cerului. In his career, Ianc played for teams such as Liberty Salonta, Luceafărul Oradea, Bihor Oradea or Botoșani, among others.

References

External links
 
 

1986 births
Living people
Sportspeople from Oradea
Romanian footballers
Association football midfielders
Liga I players
Liga II players
CF Liberty Oradea players
CSM Câmpia Turzii players
CS Luceafărul Oradea players
FC Bihor Oradea players
FC Botoșani players
FC Brașov (1936) players
FC Olimpia Satu Mare players
Nemzeti Bajnokság I players
FC Sopron players
Romanian expatriate footballers
Romanian expatriate sportspeople in Hungary
Expatriate footballers in Hungary